The Second City's Next Comedy Legend was a summer reality show that aired on Canada's CBC Television in 2007.  Contestants improvise and create characters for their chance to win a spot on the Second City Canadian Touring Company.

Judges are Joe Flaherty, Mick Napier, Dave Thomas and Elvira Kurt and the show is hosted by Trish Stratus.  Current Second City Toronto performers Matt Baram, Paul Bates, Anand Rajaram and Naomi Snieckus act as mentors.  The show is co-executive produced by Second City CEO Andrew Alexander and producer Morgan Elliot.

Auditions for the 2007 show took place March 20 in Vancouver, March 24 in Calgary, March 27 in Halifax and April 4 in Toronto.

The show premiered on July 10, 2007.

See also 
 The Second City
 Second City Television
 Reality television

References

External links 
The Second City Official Website
Official Myspace Page
 

Second City Television
CBC Television original programming
2000s Canadian reality television series
2007 Canadian television series debuts
2007 Canadian television series endings